, a.k.a.  is a television station in Hiroshima. It is a network station of ANN.  It is broadcast in Hiroshima Prefecture.

History
On September 18, 1964, the station makes a license request as Setonaikai Broadcasting (unrelated to the current TV station of the same name).
December 1, 1970: The station commenced operating as an affiliate of Nippon Educational Television (NET TV, current TV Asahi). The original abbreviation was UHT (UHF Hiroshima-Home Television).
April 1, 1974: The station joins ANN.
October 1, 1975: TV Shin-Hiroshima System (TSS) starts broadcasting. Fuji TV network programming migrates to the new station.
November 14, 1985: Bilingual sound multiplex broadcasts start. Some programs shown are available in English.
April 1, 1986: New corporate identity. Along with it, the main abbreviation changed to HOME.
2000: The station's mascot, Pol Pol, was created upon the station's 30th anniversary celebrations, tie-in merchandise was also released.
2006: Digital terrestrial broadcasts commence.
July 24, 2011: Analog terrestrial broadcasts conclude.
January 2013: Full ratings for the previous year confirm that Hiroshima Home Television became a ratings leader in the prefecture.

References

External links
Official website of Hiroshima Home TV

All-Nippon News Network
Mass media in Hiroshima
Companies based in Hiroshima Prefecture
Television stations in Japan
Television channels and stations established in 1970